Strijensas is a village in the Dutch province of South Holland. It is located about 12 km southwest of the city of Dordrecht, in the municipality of Hoeksche Waard.

The village was first mentioned in 1617 as "'t Sas van Stryen", and means "the sluice of Strijen". Strijensas developed after 1650 at the mouth of the harbour canal of Strijen.

The first Dutch Reformed church was built in 1879. In February 1945, it was destroyed by war and replaced in 1952.

Strijensas was home to 301 people in 1840. Nowadays, it consists of about 180 houses. It was a separate municipality between 1817 and 1855, when it became part of Strijen. In 2019, it became part of the municipality of Hoeksche Waard.

References

External links
 Strijensas Info

Populated places in South Holland
Former municipalities of South Holland
Hoeksche Waard